Buckley Barracks is a British Army barracks in Wiltshire, England, about  north of Chippenham and  west of Swindon.

History

The barracks are located on the technical site of the former RAF Hullavington which closed on 31 March 1992. On handover of the site to the Army in April 1993, it became known as Hullavington Barracks. The airfield part of the site was retained by the RAF and used for gliding until September 2016, when flying ceased.

In 1993 as part of the draw-down of the BAOR and withdrawal from Germany, 237 Signal Squadron, a field squadron of 14 Signal Regiment (Electronic Warfare) relocated from Celle, Germany to Hullavington. The Squadron moved again in June 1996 to rejoin the other two Squadrons (226 and 245 Signal Squadrons) that make up 14 Signal Regiment at Cawdor Barracks near Haverfordwest, Pembrokeshire.

The barracks were renamed Buckley Barracks in 2003, after the Victoria Cross recipient Major John Buckley.

Based units 
The following notable units are based at Buckley Barracks.

British Army 
 Royal Logistics Corps
9 Theatre Logistics Regiment
 90 Headquarters Squadron
 66 Fuel and General Transport Squadron
84 Medical Supply Squadron
95 Supply Squadron
 27 Theatre Logistic Regiment
 91 Supply Squadron

Role and Operations
The barracks are currently occupied by 9 Theatre Logistic Regiment of the Royal Logistic Corps (RLC). As of 1 November 2018, there was 659 personnel assigned to the regiment.

Future 
In November 2016, the Ministry of Defence announced that the site would close in 2029 as part of the Better Defence Estate review.

References

Installations of the British Army
Barracks in England
Buildings and structures in Wiltshire